Counterfeit² is the first full-length studio album by Martin Gore, the primary songwriter for the band Depeche Mode, and his second release (his first being Counterfeit e.p. in 1989).

Released April 28, 2003 in Europe and April 29, 2003 in the US, Counterfeit² is an album featuring 11 covers of songs that Gore considered influential to his own compositions for Depeche Mode. He recorded this album around the same time as David Gahan recorded his first solo album Paper Monsters, after the Exciter tour was finished, and around the same time Andrew Fletcher produced Client's self-titled debut album.
Counterfeit² is a very synth heavy album compared to Depeche Mode's prior two albums, Exciter and Ultra, and includes a song sung completely in German ("Das Lied vom einsamen Mädchen").

Gore also went on a brief tour consisting of a few concerts in Europe and only Los Angeles in North America.

Track listing

CD: Mute / CDSTUMM214 (UK) 

"In My Time of Dying" – 4:24 (Traditional, Gore's version is primarily influenced by Bob Dylan's recording, though the Led Zeppelin version is more well known.)
"Stardust" – 3:08 (written by David Essex)
"I Cast a Lonesome Shadow" – 4:51 (written by Hank Thompson, Lynn Russwurm)
"In My Other World" – 3:53 (written by Julee Cruise, Louis Tucci)
"Loverman" – 7:02 (written by Nick Cave)
"By This River" – 4:01 (written by Brian Eno, Hans-Joachim Roedelius, Dieter Moebius)
"Lost in the Stars" – 2:52 (written by Maxwell Anderson, Kurt Weill)
"Oh My Love" – 3:33 (written by John Lennon, Yoko Ono)
"Das Lied vom einsamen Mädchen"  – 5:25 (written by Werner R. Heymann, Robert Gilbert, originally performed by Hildegard Knef)
"Tiny Girls" – 3:20 (written by David Bowie, Iggy Pop)
"Candy Says" – 4:35 (written by Lou Reed, originally performed by The Velvet Underground)

Personnel 
Andrew Phillpott – producer
Paul Freegard – producer
Anton Corbijn – art direction, sleeve photo
Jennifer Secord - supplementary photos
 Peter Gordeno - piano on "Lost in the Stars", Fender Rhodes on "Das Lied Von Einsamen Mädchen" and backward solo on "Tiny Girls"
Martin L. Gore – vocals, synthesizer, guitar, arranger
Kris Solem – mastering
Recorded at Electrical Ladyboy

Singles

Stardust 
 A single for the track "Stardust" was released two weeks prior to the release of Counterfeit². It included the B-sides "Life Is Strange" and a video of "Left Hand Luke and the Beggar Boys" (both are two soul songs written by Marc Bolan from the 1973 T.Rex album Tanx), along with various remixes of "Stardust" and "I Cast a Lonesome Shadow".

Loverman EP² 
 After Counterfeit², saw the release of Loverman EP² which included mixes of "Loverman" and "Das Lied vom einsamen Mädchen". There was also a version with a DVD which included footage of Martin's Milan show on April 30, 2003 and an interview. It was released in November in the UK and was not released in the US.

References

External links
 Album information from the official Martin Gore website
 Martin Gore official website
 Depeche Mode official website

Covers albums
2003 debut albums
Mute Records albums
Martin Gore albums